Eric Iheanacho "Acho" Nwakanma (born 26 April 1958) is a Nigerian politician, businessman and philanthropist, who served twice as the 4th and then the 6th Deputy Governor of Abia State, Nigeria on the platform of the Peoples Democratic Party (PDP), from 2006 to 2007 under Governor Orji Uzor Kalu and again under Governor Theodore Orji from 2010 to 2011.

His political career began in 1999 when he was elected into the Abia State House of Assembly to represent Obingwa East State Constituency. In 2003 he was re-elected and subsequently named Deputy Speaker of the House of Assembly until Kalu nominated him as deputy governor in 2006. He contested the 2007 Senatorial elections for Abia South Senatorial District on the platform of Progressive Peoples Alliance but lost to Senator Enyinnaya Abaribe in a post election legal battle. On August 18, 2010, Orji again named him as deputy governor to succeed Chris Akomas.

Nwakanma nursed the ambition of becoming the Governor of Abia State at the end of Orji's tenure by 2015. He lost the bid to his brother-in-law Okezie Ikpeazu. In April 2013, President Goodluck Jonathan appointed him as Chairman of the Board of National Neuro Psychiatry Hospital, Enugu.

Early life and business
Eric Acho Nwakanma  was born on 26 April 1958 to the family of Sunday Nwakanma and Jemimah Nwakanma of Umorji Ohanze in Ohanze Autonomous Community of Obingwa LGA of Abia State. After his primary education at St. Michael’s Boys School Aba where he obtained his First School Leaving Certificate in 1971, he secured admission to National High School, Aba for his Secondary Education and later transferred to Community Secondary School Nbawsi where he obtained his West African School Certificate in 1976. After that, he enrolled at Government College Umuahia for his high school and finished in 1978. He proceeded to the University of Lagos where he obtained his Bachelor of Science Degree in Biochemistry in 1982.

After his National Youth Service Corps programme in Niger State, he continued his educational pursuit at the University of Lagos and obtained a Master of Science Degree in Clinical Biochemistry in 1985. Nwakanma got an appointment as a graduate assistant at the Department of Biochemistry, College of Medicine, University of Lagos from 1985 to 1986 marking the beginning of a short career in teaching. He later worked for Chemech Laboratories Nigeria Limited (now Chemiron International) Victoria Island, Lagos as a sales representative and later as zonal manager (East) from 1986 to 1989. His business interests span transportation, real estate, importation, and agriculture. He has a huge farm in Obingwa Local Government Area of Abia State.

Politics and charity
Nwakanma contested for the position of Local Government Council Chairman of Obingwa LGA Abia State in a transition that was scuttled by the military. In 1998, he became one of the founding members of the Peoples Democratic Party(PDP)  and in 1999, he got elected into the Abia State House of Assembly to represent Obingwa East State Constituency.  He was re-elected into the Abia State House of Assembly for a second term in 2003.

While his membership of Abia Legislative House lasted, he held various House Committee positions which included:
Chairman Finance and Economic Planning Committee
Chairman, Boundary and Security Committee
Member Agric and Rural Development Committee
Member Lands, Survey and Urban Planning Committee; and
Member Public Accounts Committee.

He was elected the Deputy Speaker of the Abia State House of Assembly a position he held for some years before being nominated as Deputy Governor of Abia State in March 2006 by Kalu. He ran for the Abia South Senatorial District Election in 2007 but lost the election to Enyinnaya Abaribe. 

Nwakanma was again nominated as Deputy Governor of Abia State in August 2010 by Orji. He served out as deputy governor for the remainder of the first term of Orji as governor, leaving office on May 29, 2011.

The Acho Nwakanma Foundation
Founded in 1991, The Acho Nwakanma (TAN) Foundation has been disbursing financial grants to indigent women to help them start businesses and be self-reliant. He has donated several motorcycles, tricycles, and vehicles to a good number of Abians. He has helped set up and resettle sixty-one NDE graduates. Through the foundation, he has built houses for some widows in various parts of the state.

He is a natural lover of sports and has taken joy in sponsoring sports events in the past decade and a half. He donated a trophy for an Annual Inter Community Football Competition in Obingwa LGA. The Acho Nwakanma Foundation has also over the years been a consistent driver of sports development in the state and led to the discovery and promotion of many sporting talents who now ply their trade in Spain, Israel, Ukraine, South Africa, and in professional field and track events across Nigeria. He has also been the major non-government sponsor of the Abia Comets Football Club and his joy has been seeing the club rise from little beginnings as an amateur side to becoming a professional team in the Nigeria Football League. He has also sponsored the Women Public Servants Soccer Tournament in Abia State.

He has on record over thirty University scholarships which are running at all times. He has at various times donated educational materials to primary and post primary schools in Obingwa LGA and beyond. In 2012 he organized a statewide free-medical scheme.

He organized the building of the 13 kilometer Acho Nwakanma Bypass, a wide road built with stone base and nylon-tar which connects Amuzu Ohanze-Ntighauzo-Ibeme in Obingwa Local Government Area and serves as a major route for travellers between Akwa-Ibom State and Abia State.

He is currently championing better rights and living conditions for mentally ill persons through his Foundation. He seeks to push through a legislation to protect mentally ill and the destitute at the National Assembly.

Personal life
He is married to Joy Ezinwanyi Nwakanma and has four children, three boys and a girl. Nwakanma is a Christian and attends Living Faith Church International aka Winners Chapel.

References

External links

1958 births
Living people
People from Abia State
Igbo politicians
Peoples Democratic Party (Nigeria) politicians
University of Lagos alumni
Government College Umuahia alumni